Waldenburg is a hilltop town in south central Germany, eastwards of Heilbronn in the Hohenlohe (district) of Baden-Württemberg. The town is the site of Waldenburg Castle and some hilltop churches. Records first mention Waldenburg in the year 1253, but the town was destroyed in April 1945, at the end of World War II, and it has been rebuilt since.

Geography

Geographical form
Waldenburg covers part of the natural Schwäbisch-Fränkische forest-hills and the Hohenloher-Haller Ebene.

City outline
Waldenburg includes the village of Waldenburg proper and the 2 sections Obersteinbach (173 people, as of 31 March 2006) and Sailach (222 people).

History

 of Waldenburg dates from 1253. By 1330 it was a free city. Plague and war reduced the population during the Thirty Years' War. The Confederation of the Rhine of 1806 annexed Waldenburg into the Kingdom of Württemberg under the process of "mediatisation", and the town has been part of the Federal Republic of Germany state of Baden-Württemberg since 1952.

In April 1945 at the end of World War II the town had been occupied for a last-ditch stand by the Wehrmacht against the advancing United States 3rd army, and was almost completely destroyed by American artillery. Postwar efforts have reconstructed some historic buildings.

The ancient castle still belongs to the Hohenlohe-Waldenburg-Schillingsfürst family that built it.

On 1 January 1971, there was the annexation of Upper Steinbach.

Religions
In Waldenburg, there are Protestant, Catholic and Apostolic churches. The Catholic Church, together with the parishes of Pfedelbach and Bretzfeld form a pastoral unit.

Population growth
Estimated population of Waldenburg, per year:
1648: 640
2000: 3079
2005: 3083

Politics

Mayors 

 Franz Gehweiler (November 1945–March 1978)
 Gerhard Lauth (March 1978–August 1990)
 Roland Weinschenk (December 1990–April 2004)
 Markus Knobel (July 2004–2020)
 Bernd Herzog (since 2020)

Coat of arms and flag

The blazon of arms of Waldenburg is: in the upper part of gold with green ground, are three green fir trees; below in a silver border, is a red-tongued black lion (leopard), with tail curled underneath. The flag of the city is red and white.

From the 16th Century since, the seals in the Waldenburg detectable crest reaches into the upper half of the city name, and displays in the bottom half with the leopard, the emblem of Hohenlohe. The city colors are the colors of the Hohenlohe house.

Sister cities
Waldenburg maintains partnership relations with Sierck-les-Bains in Lorraine, France.

Economy and infrastructure

Traffic
Waldenburg is located on autobahn A 6 and federal highway B 19.

Waldenburg is located in the area of HNV on the Heilbronn–Crailsheim railway. Waldenburg (Wurttemberg) station is served every two hours by Regional-Express services to Heilbronn and Crailsheim. In the hours in between Regional-Express services it is served by Regionalbahn services on the Öhringen–Schwäbisch Hall-Hessental route.

Established companies
It is situated at the foot of the mountain Waldenburg 6 in the immediate vicinity of the station Waldenburg, the Federal Autobahn and Federal Street 19.

In the industrial field, the following companies are based or have a production site:
 R. Stahl 
 Ziehl-Abegg 
 SWG (Schraubenwerk Gaisbach) of the Würth Group 
 Lidl 
 Wolff & Müller
 Würth Elektronik eiSos, part of the Würth Elektronik Group

Culture and sights

Museums
The City Council of Waldenburg is a museum with Urweltfunden. 
Since 1971, the castle houses a museum with collections of seals from the early Middle Ages.

Buildings and structures
 Schloss Waldenburg 
 Keep 
 Remnants of the monastery at the settlement site Goldbach 
 Waldenburg TV Tower
 Friedrichsberg Television Tower, a TV tower of reinforced concrete under construction
Evangelical Lutheran, Catholic, and Apostolic churches exist in Waldenburg.

East of Waldburg operates the southwest radio with the  TV Tower Waldenburg-Fredericksburg since 2008, as the main transmitter for radio and television. By 2009, the village was finished using TV Tower Waldenburg in operation, which was dismantled after the shutdown to the water tower.

Nature
Near the settlement site Goldbach are the nature reserves of Rößlesmahdsee, with Pfaffenklinge and the Eastern Goldbachsee lake.

Between Obersteinbach and the hamlet of Tommelhardt are the nature reserves of Obere Weide (pasture) and Entlesboden, which show the natural vegetation of the old Hutewälder forest.

References

Hohenlohe (district)
Burial sites of the House of Urach